Platycerioideae is a small subfamily of the fern family Polypodiaceae in the Pteridophyte Phylogeny Group classification of 2016 (PPG I). The subfamily is also treated as the tribe Platycerieae within a very broadly defined family Polypodiaceae sensu lato.

Two genera are recognized in PPG I:
 Platycerium Desv.
 Pyrrosia Mirb.

References

Epiphytes
Plant subfamilies